Cameron Run Regional Park is a regional park located on Eisenhower Avenue, near Cameron Run, in Alexandria, northern Virginia. 

It is protected and operated by the NOVA Parks agency of Northern Virginia, formerly the Northern Virginia Regional Park Authority.

Features
The park features batting cages, a full 18 hole miniature golf course, and a waterpark. 

The waterpark, known as Great Waves, has a wave pool, a toddlers pool, and water slides.

See also

References

External links 
 NOVA Parks.org: official Cameron Run Regional Park website

NOVA Parks
Parks in Alexandria, Virginia
Regional parks in Virginia
Water parks in Virginia